Manouchehri House is a historic house in Kashan, Iran, now in use as a hotel.  Its primary architecture dates back to the Safavid dynasty. Manouchehri House was partly ruined by the 1778 earthquake and was rebuilt in the Qajar era. In 2007, the house was bought and registered as a heritage monument, despite being in a state of disrepair. After major restoration work, the house became the first boutique hotel in Iran. It was awarded a Lonely Planet Top Choice award in 2012. It was shortlisted for an Aga Khan Award.

References

External links
Manouchehri House website

Houses in Iran
Monuments and memorials in Iran
Kashan
Buildings and structures in Isfahan Province